Events in the year 2001 in Bulgaria.

Incumbents 

 President: Petar Stoyanov
 Prime Minister: Ivan Kostov (from 1997 until July 24) Simeon Sakskoburggotski (from July 24 until 2005)

Events 

 November – Thousands march through Sofia on 100th day of Simeon's premiership, saying he has failed to improve living standards.

References 

 
2000s in Bulgaria
Years of the 21st century in Bulgaria
Bulgaria
Bulgaria